Corey Devon Liuget (born March 18, 1990) is a former American football defensive tackle. He played college football at Illinois, and was drafted by the San Diego Chargers in the first round of the 2011 NFL Draft.

College career
During his three-year Illinois career, Liuget had 125 tackles, 25.5 TFLs and 8.5 sacks Liuget had a career year in 2010, earning Second-team All-Big Ten accolades after recording 63 tackles, 12.5 tackles for loss, 4.5 sacks, 10 quarterback hurries and three passes broken up. In 2009, he played in all 12 games, making four starts. In 2008, he ranked fifth in the Big Ten in fumbles recovered and played in 11 games and started two at defensive tackle as a true-freshman.

After his junior season, Liuget announced that he would forgo his senior season and enter the 2011 NFL Draft.

Professional career

San Diego / Los Angeles Chargers
Liuget was drafted in the first round as the 18th draft pick by the San Diego Chargers.

In his rookie season, Liuget played in 15 games, including 13 starts, and recorded 19 total tackles, a sack, and a forced fumble. The team's first-round pick in the 2011 NFL Draft, Liuget had to grow up in a hurry as the NFL Lockout wiped out what would have been his first offseason. Instead of working out with teammates and studying with coaches, Liuget was forced to work alone. When the lockout ended and the season rolled around, injuries hammered the Chargers’ defensive line and the young rookie was pressed into immediate duty. Liuget ended up playing in 15 games with 13 starts.

In 2012, Liuget had a breakout season: the 2nd year man started all 16 games and had a tremendous impact on the Chargers defense.

Liuget went on to lead San Diego's defensive line in sacks (7), tackles (61), tackles for loss (15) and passes defended (9) in 2012, and his nine passes defended were second in the NFL among defensive linemen behind Houston's J. J. Watt’s 15. Liuget’s improved conditioning also contributed to a strong finish to the season as he tallied five sacks in the team’s last six games, including a career-high two in the Chargers’ December 23 win over the New York Jets. At the end of the season, he was named Chargers Defensive Player of Year (David Griggs Memorial Award). He was also on USA Today's All-Joe team.

In 2013, Liuget went on to lead the defense with 5.5 sacks. He also added 42 tackles, 2 passes defended, 1 field goal blocked, and a forced fumble.

In the 2014 season, Liuget got his first NFL touchdown against the San Francisco 49ers after recovering a fumble forced by Dwight Freeney and Ricardo Mathews. Liuget finished the season with 4.5 sacks 57 tackles, 2 passes defended, and 2 forced fumbles.

Liuget signed a five-year, $58.5 million extension with the Chargers, with $30 million guaranteed on June 9, 2015. On December 12, 2015, he was placed on injured reserve.

On March 23, 2018, Liuget was suspended four games due to a PED violation. In Week 11, Liuget suffered a torn quad tendon and was ruled out for the season. He was placed on injured reserve on November 21, 2018.

On February 13, 2019, the Chargers declined the option on Liuget's contract, making him a free agent.

Oakland Raiders
On August 25, 2019, Liuget signed with the Oakland Raiders. He was released on October 30, 2019.

Buffalo Bills
On November 5, 2019, Liuget was signed by the Buffalo Bills.

Houston Texans
On September 28, 2020, Liuget was signed to the Houston Texans practice squad. He was elevated to the active roster on November 7, November 14, and November 25 for the team's weeks 9, 10, and 12 games against the Jacksonville Jaguars, Cleveland Browns, and Detroit Lions, and reverted to the practice squad after each game. He was promoted to the active roster on December 2, 2020. Liuget was waived on December 21, 2020.

Retirement
On October 22, 2022, Liuget signed a one day contract to retire as a member of the Los Angeles Chargers.

NFL statistics

Personal life
Liuget is of Haitian descent. He was raised by his mother, as his father was killed when he went back to visit his grandmother in Haiti.

References

External links
Illinois Fighting Illini bio

1990 births
Living people
American sportspeople of Haitian descent
Players of American football from Miami
American football defensive ends
American football defensive tackles
Illinois Fighting Illini football players
San Diego Chargers players
Los Angeles Chargers players
Oakland Raiders players
Buffalo Bills players
Houston Texans players
Hialeah Senior High School alumni